Jamie Murray is a professional tennis player who is the current British number three doubles player. He has reached thirteen grand slam finals in total: (5 Doubles, 8 Mixed), he has won the mixed doubles at the 2007 and 2017 Wimbledon Championships, at the 2017, 2018, and 2019 US Open and the men's doubles at the 2016 Australian Open and 2016 US Open, and has finished as runner-up in the men's doubles tournament at the 2015 Wimbledon Championships, 2015 US Open and 2021 US Open and in mixed doubles at the 2008 US Open and 2020 Australian Open. Murray has been ranked as high as World No. 1 in the ATP doubles rankings, and was the first Britain to be ranked as world number one since the introduction of computerised world rankings in the 1970s. His current rank is at world No. 29, as of 13 February 2023.

Murray made his professional tennis debut on the main tour in Nottingham Open in 2006. So far in his career, Murray has won a total of 28 doubles titles and 5 mixed doubles titles.

Below is a list of career achievements and titles won by Jamie Murray.

Grand Slam finals

Doubles: 5 (2 titles, 3 runner-ups)

Mixed doubles: 8 (5 titles, 3 runner-ups)

Other significant finals

Masters 1000 finals

Doubles: 6 (1 title, 5 runner-ups)

Team competitions finals

Davis Cup: 1 (1 title)

ATP career finals

Doubles: 57 (28 titles, 29 runner-ups)

ATP Challengers & ITF Futures finals

Doubles: 31 (18 titles, 13 runners-up)

Performance timelines

Men's doubles
Current through the 2023 Dallas Open.

1 Held as Hamburg Masters (outdoor clay) until 2008, Madrid Masters (outdoor clay) 2009 – present.
2 Held as Madrid Masters (indoor hard) until 2008, and Shanghai Masters (outdoor hard) 2009 – present.
3 Including appearances in Grand Slam and ATP World Tour main draw matches, and in Summer Olympics.
4 Including matches in Grand Slam, in ATP World Tour, in Summer Olympics and in Davis Cup.

Mixed doubles

Record against other players

Top 10 wins

Career Grand Slam tournament seedings

The tournaments won by Murray are in boldface.

National participation

Davis Cup

Participations: (14–7)

   indicates the outcome of the Davis Cup match followed by the score, date, place of event, the zonal classification and its phase, and the court surface.

Wins: 1

Summer Olympics

Doubles: (2–4)

Mixed Doubles: (0–1)

Commonwealth Games

Singles (1–1)

Doubles: (0–1)

Mixed Doubles: (1–1)

References
General
Career finals, Grand Slam seedings, information for the performance timelines, top 10 wins and national participation information have been taken from these sources:

 
  
  
  
  
  
  
  

  
  
  
  
  
  
 

Specific

Tennis career statistics